The 1998 Ibero-American Championships in Athletics (Spanish: VIII Campeonato Iberoamericano de Atletismo) was the eighth edition of the international athletics competition between Ibero-American nations which was held at the Estádio Universitário de Lisboa in Lisbon, Portugal from 17–19 July.

As had previously occurred at the 1992 edition, the competition coincided with a world's fair, being held as part of Lisbon's Expo '98 event. The Spanish team topped the medal table with sixteen gold medals and 37 medals in total. Mexico won the next highest number of golds, taking seven in a haul of 16 medals, while the hosts Portugal had the second highest medal tally, having secured 21 medals in the three-day competition. Cuba sent a small delegation due to economic constraints and many of its foremost athletes were absent. In spite of this five Cubans topped the podium, leaving them fourth in the rankings.

Mexico's Ana Guevara won her first international medals in Lisbon, taking 400 m individual and relay titles as well as a silver medal in the 800 metres. Twenty-year-old Yago Lamela also won his first international long jump medal and later went on to win medals on the world stage. The 1997 London Marathon champion António Pinto won the 5000 metres gold for the hosts with a championship record time of 13:34.34 minutes. Chilean Sebastián Keitel continued his success at the competition by repeating his 100/200 metres double of the 1996 edition.

Although the overall standard of the competition was not as high as other years, nine championships records were improved at the event. Liliana Allen, formerly of Cuba, won the women's 100 m gold in a record of 11.32 seconds. Alberto Sánchez bettered the men's hammer throw mark, while María Eugenia Villamizar won her third straight women's hammer title with another championships record. Dana Cervantes and Alejandra García established a new record in the women's pole vault, a contest whose introduction brought the 43-event programme to near parity for the sexes (the men's steeplechase being the sole remaining difference). National records were also set in Lisbon: Lisette Rondón beat the Chilean 100 m record, Sebastian Keitel's winning time of 10.10 seconds was also a new Chilean mark, while 100 m and 200 m medalist Carlos Gats set Argentine records in both disciplines.

Medal summary

Men

† Note: a Spanish team and a Portuguese team entered the 4×100 metres relay race, but both were disqualified.
‡ Note: the official medal count has Mexico's Héctor Torres as the joint 800 m bronze medallist. Although, he and Hudson de Souza both had finishing times of 3:41.14 minutes, the official results list Torres as coming in fourth place in the race.

Women

† Note: a Colombian team entered the 4×100 metres relay, but was disqualified.

Medal table

†Note: The medal count from the 2010 Ibero-American Championships report is incorrect as it gives Mexico four bronze medals instead of three – Héctor Torres had the same finishing time as the 1500 m bronze medallist Hudson de Souza, but is noted as having finished in fourth place.

Participation
Four new members of the Asociación Iberoamericana de Atletismo competed at the championships for the first time: Cape Verde, Guinea-Bissau, Mozambique and São Tomé and Príncipe. This meant that 21 of the 28 members at that time sent delegations to the championships, which was the second highest number after the 1992 edition. A total of 327 athletes competed at the 1998 edition of the championships.

The absence of Costa Rica, Dominican Republic, Honduras, Nicaragua and Panama significantly reduced the participation of Central American and Caribbean athletes.

 (1)
 (19)
 (1)
 (29)
 (4)
 (14)
 (27)
 (18)
 (2)
 (4)
 (4)
 (32)
 (4)
 (2)
 (2)
 (73)
 (2)
 (4)
 (2)
 (67)
 (2)
 (14)

References

Results
Ibero American Championships. GBR Athletics. Retrieved on 2012-01-05.
El Atletismo Ibero-Americano - San Fernando 2010 (pgs. 151-160). RFEA. Retrieved on 2012-01-05.

Ibero-American Championships in Athletics
Ibero-American Championships
Ibero-American
International athletics competitions hosted by Portugal
Sports competitions in Lisbon
July 1998 sports events in Europe
1990s in Lisbon